Comostola leucomerata is a species of moth of the  family Geometridae. It is known from rainforests in New South Wales and Queensland.

The wingspan is about 20 mm. Adults are green with each hindwing having a large brown spot near the base.

References

Hemitheini
Moths described in 1866